Mary Jane (Jean) Middlemass (pen name, Mignionette; 14 July 1833 – 4 November 1919) was an English novelist at the turn of the 20th-century.

Middlemass was the daughter of Robert Hume Middlemass (of the Westbarns of Haddington), and Mary Porter in Marylebone, London, England.

Her first works were published under the pseudonym "Mignionette", by her father in 1851. She published prolifically from the 1870s through to when her last book was published in 1910, and was one of the authors of the collaborative work The Fate of Fenella.

Works
 Lil (London, 1872)
 Wild Georgie (London, 1873)
 Baiting the Trap: a novel (London, 1875)
 Mr Dorillion: a novel (London, 1876)
 Touch and Go (London, 1877)
 Innocence at Play: a novel (London, 1880)
 Sealed by a Kiss: a novel (London, 1880)
 Sackcloth and Broadcloth: a novel (London, 1881)
 Four in Hand: a novel (London, 1881)
 Poisoned Arrows: a novel (London, 1884)
 A Girl in a Thousand: a novel (London, 1885)
 The Loadstone of Love: a novel (London, 1886)
 Nelly Jocelyn, Widow: a novel (London, 1887)
 Vaia's Lord: a novel (London, 1889)
 Two False Moves: a novel (London, 1890)
 Hush Money (London, 1895)
 She's Fooling Thee! (London, 1895)
 Vengeance is Mine: a novel (London, 1895)
 Blanche Coningham's Surrender: a tale (London, 1898)
 In Storm and Strife: a novel (London, 1899).
 The Yellow Badge (London, 1899)
 His Lawful Wife (London, 1901)
 A Wheel of Fire (London, 1901)
 Fallen from Favour (London, 1902)
 A Woman's Calvary (London, 1903)
 Count Reminy (London, 1905)
 A Felon's Daughter (London, 1906)
 A Veneered Scamp (London, 1906)
 An Evil Angel (London, 1908)
 Mignon's Peril (London, 1909)
 Loves Old and New (London, 1909)
 At the Altar Steps (London, 1910)

References

External links
 
 
 

1833 births
1919 deaths
19th-century English novelists
19th-century British women writers
20th-century English novelists
20th-century British women writers